Namamyia is a genus of mortarjoint casemakers in the family Odontoceridae. There is one described species in Namamyia, N. plutonis.

References

Further reading

 
 
 

Trichoptera genera
Articles created by Qbugbot
Integripalpia